The following lists events in the year 2021 in Mauritania.

Incumbents 

 President: Mohamed Ould Ghazouani
 Prime Minister: Mohamed Ould Bilal

Events 

January 19 – U.S. Immigration and Customs Enforcement deports between four and six asylum seekers to Mauritania on the last day of President Donald Trump′s administration.

Scheduled events

May 14 – Eid Al Fitr holiday, Muslim ″Breaking of the Fast″.
November 28 – Independence Day, from France in 1960.

Culture
April 1 – The Mauritanian, a movie based on Guantanamo Diary by Mohamedou Ould Salahi, who was held and tortured in Guantanamo Bay detention camp, is scheduled for release. The film received two nominations at the 78th Golden Globe Awards.

Deaths

See also

Economic Community of West African States
Community of Sahel–Saharan States
COVID-19 pandemic in Africa
African Continental Free Trade Area
Organisation internationale de la Francophonie

References 

 
2020s in Mauritania
Years of the 21st century in Mauritania
Mauritania
Mauritania